Al Ghareef is a village in Makkah Province, in western Saudi Arabia.
 The official language is Arabic. It consider as one of wider villages in Makkah Province.

See also 

 List of cities and towns in Saudi Arabia
 Regions of Saudi Arabia

References

Populated places in Mecca Province